Carenum sumptuosum is a species of ground beetle in the subfamily Scaritinae. It was described by John O. Westwood in 1842.

References

sumptuosum
Beetles described in 1842